İkiz Islands (literally "Twin Islands") are two small Aegean islands of Turkey. They are in Gulf of Güllük. Administratively they are a part of Bodrum ilçe (district) of Muğla Province. They are to the south west of Salih Island.

References

Aegean islands
Islands of Turkey
Islands of Muğla Province
Bodrum District